The Minister of Culture and National Heritage of Poland may inscribe a Polish museum into the National Register of Museums in order to confirm the high level of its cultural activity and the importance of its collection. Only those museums that meet the required criteria – including importance of the museum's collection, a team of well qualified employees, an adequate building, and a permanent source of financing – may be entered into the register. Such museums are known as registered museums. A registered museum that no longer meets the criteria may be removed from the register.

Registered museums enjoy certain privileges that other museums in Poland do not. A registered museum has the right of pre-emption for artefacts offered for sale by antique traders and at auctions. Directors of registered museums elect triennially from among themselves eleven out of 21 members of the Museums Council, which advises the Minister of Culture and National Heritage on matters related to museums.

Among the 130 registered museums, the vast majority are state-owned. Sixteen of these are deemed to be of national importance and hence supervised directly by ministries of the national government – the  Ministry of National Defence in the case of the Polish Army Museum and the Ministry of Culture and National Heritage for all the remaining ones. The rest of the state-owned museums are either under the supervision of local authorities of various levels (voivodeships, counties or communes) or are supervised jointly by a government ministry and local authorities. Additionally, one registered museum belongs to a state-owned university (the Jagiellonian University Museum) and one is privately owned (the Private Automotive and Technological Museum in Otrębusy).

Warsaw, the capital and largest city of Poland, has the highest concentration of registered museums, numbering sixteen. It is followed by Kraków, with nine registered museums; Gdańsk, which is home to four registered museums; and further by Lublin, Łódź and Opole, with three each.

Registered museums

Formerly registered museums 
The following museums have been removed from the register.

References

Sources 
 
 
 

Registered